A prom is a dance party of high school students.

Prom, Proms or The Prom may also refer to:

 Programmable ROM, a form of digital memory
 BBC Proms, an annual summer season of daily classical music concerts in London

Arts and entertainment

Film
 Prom (film), a 2011 teen comedy from Walt Disney Pictures
 The Prom (film), a 2020 American musical comedy film
 Flawless (2018 film) ('Prom'), a 2018 Israeli drama film

Television
 "Prom" (The Secret Circle)

Music
 Prom (album), by Amy Ray, 2005
 The Prom (band), an American indie band
 "Prom", a song by Mindless Self Indulgence from the 2005 album You'll Rebel to Anything
 "Prom" (SZA song), a song by SZA from their 2007 album Ctrl
 "Prom", a song by Vulfpeck from the 2011 album Mit Peck

Other uses in arts and entertainment
 Prom, a 2005 novel by Laurie Halse Anderson
 The Prom (musical), 2016

Medicine
 Passive range of motion exercises, in physical therapy
 Patient reported outcome measures
 Prelabor rupture of membranes, in obstetrics

Other uses
 PROM-1, an antipersonnel mine
 Phosphate rich organic manure
 The Prom, or Wilsons Promontory National Park, in Victoria, Australia
 La Prom, nickname of the Promenade des Anglais in Nice, France

See also

 Prom Night (disambiguation)
 Prom Queen (disambiguation)
 Promenade (disambiguation)